Yarri may refer to:

 Eucalyptus patens (or yarri), a tree found in southwest Australia
 Queensland tiger (or yarri), a cryptid found in Queensland, Australia
 Yarri, Western Australia, an abandoned town in Australia
 Yarri (Wiradjuri) aka Coonong Denamundinna (1810-1880), an aboriginal Australian man and local hero
 Iyarri (Yarri), a god worshiped in Anatolia in the Bronze Age

See also
 Yari (disambiguation)
 Yarrie (disambiguation)